Ovidia is a monotypic genus of wasps belonging to the family Torymidae. The only species is Ovidia conicicollis.

The species is found in Australia.

References

Torymidae